DC Showcase: Death is an American animated short superhero film directed by Sam Liu, written by J.M. DeMatteis and produced by Warner Bros. Animation and DC Entertainment based on the eponymous character created by Neil Gaiman and Mike Dringenberg. The short was included as part of the home media release of Wonder Woman: Bloodlines. The artwork for the Portrait of Death, as well as several sketch drawings seen during the end credits, were done by comic book artist Jae Lee.

Plot
The story tells of Vincent Omata, a man living in Gotham City, told in flashbacks.

As a boy, Vincent loves to draw lying on his bedroom floor for hours at a time. Ignoring his father's criticisms, Vincent enrolls in the fine arts program at Gotham University as an adult. There, his professor deems him not talented enough to succeed and cruelly suggests a career in dentistry instead. Over time, Vincent's fruitless toil as a struggling artist causes the deterioration of his relationship, ending in his girlfriend Charlotte walking out on him after six years.

The short finds Vincent painting the front gates at Arkham Asylum, where he is fired in short order for his slow pace of work and defiant attitude. He seeks solace in a bar but is tormented by ghosts of his past in the form of fiery demons: his father, his art professor, Charlotte, and now his former boss at Arkham. At the bar, Vincent encounters a pale woman in black clothes and gothic makeup. Immediately enamored with her, Vincent expresses a desire to paint her portrait, but the woman explains she has to go and exits the bar to the sounds of emergency vehicle lights and to meet a man named Pedro. Pedro was the conversation of the bartender and Vincent early who was an employee of the pub who became sick and collapse on the job.

Vincent staggers home to a decrepit apartment. He shoots up on the couch and falls into a deep sleep, only waking to the sound of a crash. Vincent looks out his window to find the same goth woman being yelled at by two strangers. Vincent defends her from the window, but when he goes outside to help, he finds her all alone, the two people revealed to the viewers as the victims of the recent car crash. The woman offers to see Vincent's work, and he brings her up to his apartment.

Inside, Vincent is shy about all his unfinished canvases, and his demons ridicule him. The woman remarks that he's gifted, but notes that there is a spark missing from his work that he may have had long ago. Vincent explains about his childhood spent on his bedroom floor drawing, and how it felt like time stopped when he was creating. He again mentions painting her portrait, explaining that he sees something special in her. She graciously agrees to pose for him. As Vincent prepares to paint, the demons tirelessly try to distract him but he ignores them. While he paints, the demons begin to die, burning out one by one. When he is finished, Vincent is amazed with his work until he realizes that it is still evening and time has stopped.

It is revealed that the mysterious woman is Death and that Vincent died from an overdose of heroin on his couch hours ago. Distraught, Vincent posits that at least this portrait will be a worthwhile thing to leave behind. However, when time unpauses, ash from the cigarette in Vincent's corpse's hand falls onto some loose papers and sets his apartment on fire. He attempts to save the painting, but his ghostly body is unable to touch it. Vincent begs Death to stop this, but Death remarks that the end of his story was written in the book of Destiny long before he was born. As the apartment burns, Vincent asks her to save the painting as his last wish. Morphing into the boy he once was when he was drawing, Vincent recognizes Death as the character of his childhood drawings. He thanks her and Death leads him by hand to the afterlife. Later, after Gotham City Fire Department puts out the fire and Vincent's charred body is carried away, firefighters are surprised to find everything destroyed but the portrait.

Cast
 Leonardo Nam as Vincent Omata
 Jamie Chung as Death
 Darin De Paul as Professor
 Keith Szarabajka as Supervisor
 Kari Wahlgren as Charlotte

References

External links
 

2019 animated films
2019 short films
2019 films
American adult animated films
DC Showcase
Films about fictional painters
Films directed by Sam Liu
Superhero drama films
2010s Warner Bros. animated short films
Warner Bros. Animation animated short films
Warner Bros. direct-to-video animated films